Hans-Joachim "Hajo" Herrmann (1 August 1913 – 5 November 2010) was a  World War II Luftwaffe pilot and officer and was awarded the Knight's Cross of the Iron Cross with Oak Leaves and Swords.

After the war Hermann became a Nazi activist and lawyer whose high-profile cases included the defence of neo-Nazis and genocide deniers while simultaneously promoting denial and the movement's organisations.

Military career
Hermann began his military career as an infantry officer, but was commissioned into the newly formed Luftwaffe (air force) in 1935. From 1936 until 1937 he was a bomber pilot in Condor Legion in the Spanish Civil War.

Early in World War II, Hermann flew bombing missions in the Invasion of Poland and Norwegian Campaign. By 1940 he was Commander of the 7th Staffel of KG 4 and took part in the Battle of Britain. He sank 70,000 tons of Allied shipping as a bomber pilot, and was instrumental in the attack upon convoy PQ-17.

In February 1941 his group was transferred to Sicily, from where it attacked Malta then fought in the Battle of Greece. In one attack Herrmann sank the ammunition ship  in the Port of Piraeus. The explosion sank 11 ships and made the Greek port unusable for many months.

In July 1942 he was assigned to the general staff in Germany, where he became a confidant of Luftwaffe commander Hermann Göring. In 1942 Herrmann was appointed to the Luftwaffe Operational Staff. He played a role in the creation of night fighter wing Jagdgeschwader 300 Wilde Sau (Wild Boar) using day fighters at night in response to the night raids of Royal Air Force (RAF) Bomber Command on Germany in mid-1943. As a single seat night fighter he scored 9 victories.

In December 1943 Herrmann was appointed Luftwaffe Inspector of Aerial Defence. By 1944 he was Inspector General of night fighters and received the Knight's Cross with Oak Leaves and Swords. At the end of 1944 he led the 9th Air Division.

Herrmann was a leading exponent of the tactical deployment of Rammjäger Sonderkommando Elbe (ram fighters), sent into action in April 1945. Suicide pilot volunteers, often aged 18 to 20, were to be trained only to be competent enough to control specially lightened and unarmoured Bf 109 fighters and bring down Allied bombers by ramming the tail or control surfaces with the propellers of their aircraft and bailing out if possible. Herrmann's intention was to gather a large number of these fighters for a one-off attack on the USAAF bomber formations in the hope of causing enough losses to curtail the bombing offensive for a few months. Fuel shortages prevented employment of the large numbers necessary, although from one mission of this type, on 7 April 1945, of the 120 fighters thus committed only 15 returned.

Law career and Nazi activism
Herrmann surrendered to Soviet forces after the war, was held prisoner for 10 years and returned to Germany in 1955. Then he studied law and settled in Düsseldorf. He defended Otto Ernst Remer, the head of the neo-Nazi Socialist Reich Party and the Holocaust deniers David Irving and Fred A. Leuchter. Hermann's affinity for Remer, a committed Nazi and former Wehrmacht officer, was rooted in their mutual Holocaust denial activities. In October 1999 he had another interview with historians Colin Heaton and Jon Guttman. Heaton had been interviewing Herrmann for over ten years.

In 1959 Herrmann married the German soprano Ingeborg Reichelt. The couple had two children.

Awards
 Spanish Cross in Bronze with Swords
 Iron Cross (1939) 2nd Class (October 1939) and 1st Class (27 May 1940)
 Ehrenpokal der Luftwaffe (28 September 1940)
 German Cross in Gold on 5 June 1942 as Hauptmann in the III./KG 30
 Knight's Cross of the Iron Cross with Oak Leaves and Swords
 Knight's Cross on 13 October 1940 as Oberleutnant and Staffelkapitän of the 7./KG 4 "General Wever"
 269th Oak Leaves on 2 August 1943 as Major and Geschwaderkommodore of JG 300
 43rd Swords on 23 January 1944 as Oberst and Inspekteur der Nachtjagd in the Reichsluftfahrtministerium and commander of the 30. Jagd-Division

References

Citations

Bibliography

External links

1913 births
2010 deaths
Condor Legion personnel
German World War II flying aces
Luftwaffe World War II generals
Military personnel from Kiel
People from the Province of Schleswig-Holstein
Recipients of the Gold German Cross
Recipients of the Knight's Cross of the Iron Cross with Oak Leaves and Swords
German military personnel of the Spanish Civil War
German lawyers